Second Chance (also known as A Second Chance) is a 1976 French drama film written, directed and produced by Claude Lelouch. It was released in France on 13 October 1976 by Les Artistes Associés.

Synopsis
After a long time in prison, a woman discovers her son aged 14, studying under a scholarship.

Starring

References

External links
 
 

1976 films
1976 drama films
1970s French films
1970s French-language films
1970s prison drama films
Films about mother–son relationships
Films directed by Claude Lelouch
Films scored by Francis Lai
French drama films
French prison films